Pohjalainen was a morning broadsheet newspaper published in Vaasa, Finland. The paper was in circulation from 1903 to 2020.

History and profile
Pohjalainen was established in 1903. It was based in Vaasa and part of the Ilkka-Yhtymä, which also owns the Seinäjoki local and regional paper Ilkka.

As of 2009 Arno Ahosniemi was the editor-in-chief. The paper had a circulation of 26,670 copies in 2009. Pohjalainen sold 22,598 copies in 2013.

In September 2019 it was announced Pohjalainen and Ilkka would be merged into a single newspaper, known as Ilkka-Pohjalainen, starting 30 January 2020.

Editors 
 1903: O. E. Könni 
 1903–1905: Erkki Wallin-Voionmaa
 1905–1910: H. J. Räisänen 
 1910–1913: Yrjö Kataja
 1913–1924: V. J. Tuomikoski
 1924–1941: Jaakko Ikola 
 1941–1950: Heikki Hyppönen 
 1951–1980: Ilmari Laukkonen 
 1981–1984: Jaakko Korjus 
 1985–1991: Erkki Malmivaara 
 1991–1996: Jaakko Elenius 
 1996–2002: Kari Mänty
 2002–2009: Markku Mantila
 2009: Arno Ahosniemi
 2010–2013: Kalle Heiskanen 
 2014–2019: Toni Viljanmaa

References

External links
Official site

1903 establishments in Finland
2020 disestablishments in Finland
Daily newspapers published in Finland
Defunct newspapers published in Finland
Finnish-language newspapers
Mass media in Vaasa
Publications established in 1903
Publications disestablished in 2020